Running Horse is the eighteenth studio album by the country rock band Poco.  Rusty Young, Paul Cotton, and George Grantham reunite for the first time since 1977 with new material.

Reception

In his Allmusic review, music critic John Duffy called the production "weak, tentative, and thin, with dated guitar tones and studio feel" and wrote, "It's as if the alt-country explosion of the mid-'90s never happened. With so many groups owing a debt to Poco, it's hard to understand why while listening to Running Horse. All that said, Young and guitarist Paul Cotton's songs display charming honesty and rich emotional depth, more so than most any mainstream country release could muster."

Track listing
“One Tear at a Time” (Rusty Young) – 3:02
“Every Time I Hear That Train” (Paul Cotton) – 4:28
“If Your Heart Needs a Hand” (Young) – 4:59
“Never Loved... Never Hurt Like This” (Jack Sundrud) – 3:47
“Forever” (Young) – 3:31
“Never Get Enough” (Sundrud, Craig Bickhardt, David James) – 3:07
“If You Can’t Stand to Lose” (Young, John Cowan) – 4:15
“I Can Only Imagine” (Cotton) – 5:09
“Shake It” (Sundrud) – 4:54
“That’s What Love is all About” (Young, Craig Fuller) – 3:45
“Running Horse” (Cotton) – 4:07

Personnel 

Poco
 Paul Cotton – electric lead guitar, acoustic rhythm guitar, lead vocals, backing vocals 
 Rusty Young – lap steel guitar, banjo, dobro, pedal steel guitar electric rhythm guitar, acoustic rhythm guitar, lead vocals, backing vocals 
 Jack Sundrud – bass, lead vocals, backing vocals 
 George Grantham – drums, percussion, backing vocals

Additional musicians
 Tony Harrell – keyboards
 Craig Fuller – acoustic guitar (3), harmony vocals (3), backing vocals (10)
 Bill Lloyd – additional guitar (5, 8)
 John Cowan – backing vocals (7)

Production 
 Mike Clute – producer, engineer, mixing 
 Rusty Young – producer
 Jack Sundrud – engineer, collage design 
 Pete Misines – assistant engineer 
 Eric Walker – design, layout  
 Georgina Rosenbaum – cover artwork 
 Jonathan Rosenbaum – cover artwork 
 Mary Frances Brennan – photography 
 Recorded at Mike's Place and Jack's Place (Nashville, Tennessee).
 Mixed at Mike's Place

References

Poco albums
2002 albums